Trifolium microcephalum is a species of clover known by the common names smallhead clover and small-headed clover.

It is native to western North America from southern Alaska and British Columbia to California, Montana, Arizona, and Baja California, where it occurs in many types of habitat, becoming common to abundant in some regions. It can grow in disturbed habitat and become a casual roadside weed.

Description
Trifolium microcephalum is an annual herb taking a decumbent or erect form. It is coated in hairs. The leaves are made up of oval leaflets with notched tips, each measuring up to 2 centimeters long, and bristle-tipped stipules.

The inflorescence is a head of flowers borne in a bowl-like involucre of wide, hairy bracts. The head is not more than a centimeter wide. Each flower has a calyx of sepals with lobes narrowing into hairy bristles. The flower corolla is pinkish or purplish and measures 4 to 7 millimeters in length.

References

External links
 Calflora Database: Trifolium microcephalum (Hairy clover,  Maiden clover, Small headed clover)
Jepson Manual eFlora (TJM2) treatment of Trifolium microcephalum
Burke Museum, University of Washington
 UC CalPhotos gallery: Trifolium microcephalum

microcephalum
Flora of British Columbia
Flora of California
Flora of the Northwestern United States
Flora of Arizona
Flora of Nevada
Flora of the Sierra Nevada (United States)
Natural history of the California chaparral and woodlands
Natural history of the California Coast Ranges
Natural history of the Peninsular Ranges
Natural history of the Transverse Ranges